Nedyalko Mladenov (born 12 August 1961) is a former Bulgarian footballer who played as a defender.

Career
Mladenov spent the majority of his playing career with CSKA Sofia, where he won three A Group titles, five Bulgarian Cups and three Cups of the Soviet Army. He captained the team during the 1987–88 season.

After seven seasons at CSKA, Mladenov joined French Ligue 2 side En Avant de Guingamp in 1989. After leaving Guingamp at the end of the 1989–90 season, he signed with Portuguese club Braga, with whom he played 22 games in the Primeira Liga.

Honours
CSKA Sofia
 A Group (3): 1982–83, 1986–87, 1988–89
 Bulgarian Cup (5): 1982–83, 1984–85, 1986–87, 1987–88, 1988–89
 Cup of the Soviet Army (3): 1984–85, 1985–86, 1988–89

External links
 Player Profile at ForaDeJogo.net

Living people
1961 births
Association football defenders
Bulgarian footballers
PFC CSKA Sofia players
OFC Sliven 2000 players
En Avant Guingamp players
S.C. Braga players
Botev Plovdiv players
First Professional Football League (Bulgaria) players
Ligue 2 players
Primeira Liga players
Bulgarian expatriate footballers
Expatriate footballers in France
Bulgarian expatriate sportspeople in France
Expatriate footballers in Portugal
Bulgarian expatriate sportspeople in Portugal